"Coloured Kisses" is the third single from American singer Martika's 1991 album, Martika's Kitchen. The single did not chart in the US, and achieved minor chart positions in other countries. In the United Kingdom, a limited Valentine edition was released on a red 7-inch vinyl.

Music video
The music video (directed by Rocky Schenck and edited by Scott C. Wilson) shows Martika in very provocative scenes while being in a bath tub and interacting with her boyfriend (portrayed by Harold Pruett).

Track listings
7-inch single
A. "Coloured Kisses" (7-inch edit) (Frankie Blue, Les Pierce, Martika)
B. "Pride & Prejudice" (Michael Cruz, Martika)

CD single
 "Coloured Kisses" (7-inch edit) (Frankie Blue, Les Pierce, Martika) – 4:07
 "Coloured Kisses" (remix) (Frankie Blue, Les Pierce, Martika) – 4:58
 "Pride & Prejudice" (Michael Cruz, Martika) – 5:11

Charts

References

1992 singles
1992 songs
Martika songs
Music videos directed by Rocky Schenck
Song recordings produced by Robert Clivillés
Songs written by Martika